The 1960 Delaware Fightin' Blue Hens football team was an American football team that represented the University of Delaware in the Middle Atlantic Conference during the 1960 NCAA College Division football season. In its tenth season under head coach David M. Nelson, the team compiled a 3-5-1 record (2-3 against MAC opponents) and was outscored by a total of 122 to 114. Mickey Heinecken was the team captain. The team played its home games at Delaware Stadium in Newark, Delaware.

Schedule

References

Delaware
Delaware Fightin' Blue Hens football seasons
Delaware Fightin' Blue Hens football